Tamamura Kōzaburō (玉村 康三郎) (1856—1923?) was a Japanese photographer. In 1874 he opened a photographic studio in Asakusa, Tokyo and subsequently moved to Yokohama in 1883, opening his most successful studio. He was an originator of the Yokohama shashin photographic scene. His studio was still operating in 1909.

References
 Bachmann Eckenstein Art & Antiques; Asia Through the Lens, "Tamamura Kozaburo". Accessed 20 January 2007.
 Baxley, George C. Baxley Stamps, "Tamamura Kosaburo - Japanese Photographer". Accessed 17 February 2009.

1856 births
Year of death missing
Japanese photographers
Portrait photographers